Destination Anywhere: The Film (also known simply as Destination Anywhere), is an American film inspired by and featuring music and concepts from Jon Bon Jovi's second solo record Destination Anywhere. The film and album were released in June 1997. The film stars Jon Bon Jovi and Demi Moore as a young couple struggling with alcoholism and the death of their young child. Directed by Mark Pellington, the film debuted on both MTV and VH1 in 1997 and also stars Kevin Bacon, Whoopi Goldberg and Annabella Sciorra. The film was released on DVD on April 11, 2005 and includes five promotional music videos and the track "It's Just Me" also features in full during the film.

Plot
The film is a contemporary film noir set on the streets of a gritty, yet colorful Manhattan neighborhood. Jon Bon Jovi stars as JON, a man on the run from his home, his gambling debts, and his marriage. He is summoned back to New York to deal with his emotionally estranged wife, JANIE, an emergency room nurse who has never fully recovered from the hit-and-run death of their only child several years ago. Jon returns to chaos, Janie is out of control and his debts have caused his life to be in danger. He struggles to cope with the troubles at home, but has built walls that are too thick to penetrate and the problems only escalate between Jon and Janie. When an abandoned baby is found in a dumpster and brought to the hospital where Janie works, a series of events is set in motion that forces the couple to reassess the terms of their love, responsibility and commitment to one another.

Cast
Jon Bon Jovi as Jon
Demi Moore as Janie
Annabella Sciorra as Dorothy
Kevin Bacon as Mike
Whoopi Goldberg as Cabbie

Soundtrack

The Soundtrack also released in 1997 charted at #31 on The Billboard 200, #6 on the Top Canadian albums chart and #2 on the UK Albums Chart

Contents
"Destination Anywhere" Film
"Destination Anywhere"
Electronic Press Kit for the album. 
Directed by Bruce Weber 
A Little Bear Production

"Midnight In Chelsea" Music Video
Director: Wayne Isham
"Janie, Don't Take Your Love To Town" Promo Video (DVD Version Only)
Director: Mark Pellington
"Ugly" Promo Video (DVD Version Only)
Director: Mark Pellington
"Queen Of New Orleans" Promo Video (DVD Version Only)
Director: Mark Pellington
"Staring At Your Window With A Suitcase In My Hand" Promo Video (DVD Version Only - Hidden video only viewable with the "Play All" function)
Director: Mark Pellington

DVD bonus features
Promo Videos for "Queen of New Orleans", "Janie, Don't Take Your Love To Town", "Ugly" and "Staring At Your Window With A Suitcase In My Hand", previously unreleased on VHS version.
Digitally remastered picture and sound.
DTS 5.1 Surround Sound.

References

External links

1997 films
American drama films
Bon Jovi video albums
Films directed by Mark Pellington
1997 drama films
1990s English-language films
1990s American films